Can Parellada is a village which forms part of the municipality of Masquefa in the comarca of the Anoia in Catalonia, Spain. It is served by a station on the FGC railway line R6 between Barcelona and Igualada. Its population as of 2005 was 1343.

Populated places in Anoia